Enterprise is an unincorporated community located on Mississippi Highway 30 in Union County, Mississippi.

References

Unincorporated communities in Union County, Mississippi
Unincorporated communities in Mississippi